Francis Donnell Winston (October 2, 1857 – January 26, 1941) was a North Carolina politician and judge who served as the tenth Lieutenant Governor of North Carolina from 1905 to 1909 under Governor Robert B. Glenn.

Francis Winston, originally a Republican, became a leading Democrat after objecting to the inclusion of African Americans in the political alliance between his party and the Populists. He helped lead the Democrats' "white supremacy" campaigns in 1898 —when he was elected to the North Carolina House of Representatives— and in 1900.

Early life and education
Winston lived in Bertie County, North Carolina, where he was raised on a plantation in Windsor called "Windsor Castle." His brother was the university president George T. Winston.

In 1873, Winston entered Cornell University but did not graduate. When The University of North Carolina at Chapel Hill reopened in 1875, he transferred there as the first student to register. He graduated from UNC in 1879. The following year he taught school and studied law with his father, Patrick Henry Winston. In 1880 he attended Dick and Dillard Law School in Greensboro and obtained his license to practice law in 1881. This same year he was appointed Clerk of Court for Bertie County, a position which he held for two years. After this Winston entered into a successful law practice of his own in Bertie County.

Political career
In 1884, Winston was the Republican nominee for North Carolina Superintendent of Public Instruction. In 1887, he represented Bertie and Northampton Counties in the North Carolina Senate (presumably as a Republican), and in 1898, he accepted the Democratic nomination for a seat in the House of Representatives, to which he was re-elected in 1900.

In 1901, Gov. Charles B. Aycock, a college friend of Winston, appointed him Judge of superior court for the second Judicial District.

In 1904, Winston was elected lieutenant governor. Under the constitution of the time, he was not eligible to serve more than a single term. He later served as United States Attorney for the Eastern District of North Carolina.

Personal life
Winston married Rosa Mary Kenney. Although the Winstons had no children, they adopted a nephew, Stephen Etheridge Winston Kenney.

Francis Winston was an active Mason, serving as state Grand Master in 1906 and 1907. He also served as president of the North Carolina Bar Association.

References
Specific

General
 The Political Graveyard
 News & Observer
 Windsor Historic Homes
 Rootsweb: The Winstons: A Distinguished Family
 Article by Winston recalling newspapers, Bertie Ledger, 1937
 OurCampaigns.com
 NC Manual of 1913

|-

|-

|-

Lieutenant Governors of North Carolina
North Carolina state senators
Members of the North Carolina House of Representatives
North Carolina state court judges
University of North Carolina at Chapel Hill alumni
People from Windsor, North Carolina
1941 deaths
1857 births
North Carolina Republicans
North Carolina Democrats
United States Attorneys for the Eastern District of North Carolina
19th-century American lawyers
19th-century American politicians
20th-century American judges
20th-century American lawyers
20th-century American politicians
Wilmington insurrection of 1898
American white supremacists